XHPW-FM is a radio station on 94.7 FM in Poza Rica, Veracruz, Mexico.

History
XEPW-AM 1200 received its concession on November 3, 1964. It was owned by Oscar Lozano Luna and broadcast as a 250-watt daytimer. XEPW was sold to a corporation in 1977, and in the 1990s it upgraded to 1,000 watts and began nighttime service at 300 watts.

XEPW was authorized to move to FM in November 2010.

In February 2021, Arroba FM moved to XHRRR-FM 89.3 as a result of the announced sale of XHPR-FM and XHPW-FM by Grupo Radiorama to Marcos López Zamora, the owner of XHRIC-FM 101.9, who immediately took over operation of both frequencies and installed MVS Radio franchise formats.

References

Radio stations in Veracruz